Baar is a municipality in Aichach-Friedberg district, in Bavaria, southern Germany.

The municipality covers an area of 16.94 km2.
Of the total population of 589 are male, and 580 are female (Dec 31, 2003).
The population density of the community is 68 inhabitants per km2.

References

External links
Baar (Schwaben) - Official site

Aichach-Friedberg